Isaac Peretz may refer to:

 Isaac Peretz, known as Vicky Peretz, Israeli footballer
 Isaac Leib Peretz, Polish author